Allogona is a genus of air-breathing land snails, terrestrial pulmonate gastropod mollusks in the family Polygyridae.

The shell of this genus is not distinguishable from the shell of Triodopsis, but the male reproductive anatomy is unusual, and is characteristic for the genus. (The genus name, from Greek, means "different genitalia".)

Species and subspecies
Species and subspecies within the genus Allogona include:
 Allogona profunda
 Allogona profunda strontiana
 Allogona ptychophora
 Allogona ptychophora solida
 Allogona townsendiana

The classic treatment of this group by Pilsbry divides the genus into two subgenera: Allogona s.s. for A. profunda and its subspecies, and Dysmedoma for the other members of the taxon.

References

Polygyridae